Ulysses is a German progressive rock band from the early 1990s with an international line-up. They were part of a colourful scene of new bands, labels and magazines that emerged in Germany at that time. Musically, they were less influenced by the German "Krautrock" phenomenon but initially oriented strongly towards the second generation of British progressive rock bands (E.g. Marillion, IQ, Pendragon). Hegarty & Halliwell would have classified them as part of third wave of progressive rock bands, who can also be described as a second generation of neo-progressive bands. So one might not wonder that most reviewers heard similarities to Marillion, Galahad and Änglagård in their music which is characterised by a strong emphasis on melodies and the integration of folkloristic elements, abrupt changes of moods (mostly melancholic and sombre) and partly complex and ever changing arrangements often moving towards a climax.

History 
Ulysses was established in 1990 in Wiesbaden by bassist Ender Kilic, guitarist Mirko Rudnik and keyboarder Thomas Diehl. Their name refers both to the ancient Greek hero Οδυσσέας and to James Joyce's best-known work Ulysses.

Joined by Dane drummer Jasper Stannow and Australian singer Gerard P. Hynes, Ulysses recorded their first studio demos in December 1991. After Stannow left the band, Ulysses found their permanent drummer in Robert Zoom. With this line-up they recorded their debut album "Neronia" produced by renowned British musicians Clive Nolan (Arena, Pendragon, Shadowland) and Karl Groom (Threshold) in 1993. Guest vocalist on two tracks was Tracy Hitchings (Quasar, Strangers On A Train, Landmarq).

Ulysses' "Neronia" CD was released on Michael Schmitz's and Thomas Waber's renowned Inside Out Music label. A cassette edition was licensed to Metal Mind Production/Massacre Records.

With their new singer, Marc Jost, Ulysses promoted the Neronia album throughout Europe, playing shows and festivals in Poland, Germany and the Netherlands, and opening for Pendragon on their "The Window of Life" European tour in 1994.

In 1995 Ulysses played in the final of Germany's oldest and best-known rock festival for young talent, the 1822-Rock Festival.

Due to a looming naming rights dispute, Ulysses changed their band name to Neronia in 1995 and after many line-up changes released their second album "Nerotica" in 2004.

At the end of 2011, the Ulysses album Neronia was voted into Germany's Prog Top 40 by the German rock magazine Eclipsed.

In 2021, Ulysses reunited with most of the original line-up named Ulysses Resurrection Project.

Discography

Studio albums 
 1992: Ulysses (Ulysses/self release/Cassette-EP)Ulysses (20) - Ulysses
 1993: Neronia (Ulysses/Pyramusic CD-Album)Ulysses – Neronia (1993, CD)
 1994: Neronia (Ulysses/SPV/InsideOut CD-Album)Neronia
 1994: Neronia (Ulysses/Metal Mind Productions Records/Massacre Records Cassette-Album)Ulysses – Neronia (Cassette)
 2002: w/o title (Neronia/Nova Entertainment CD-EP)
 2003: Nerotica (Neronia/Nova Entertainment CD-Album)Nerotica by Neronia

Compilations 
 1992: Music for a Better World (Bamot Island Film & Records) Ulysses - Teenage Sweethearts - Demo
 1992: The Secret World - Skelletons in the Cupboard II (Clive Nolan Cassette-Sampler, Fan Club release) Ulysses - Teenage Sweethearts (Demo)
 1995: 1822-Rock Festival Finale 5. März 1995 (Frankfurter Sparkasse) Ulysses - She-Cat (live)1822-Rock-Festival Finale 5. März 1995 (1995, CD)
2004: Empire Art Rock 71 (Empire Music) Neronia - Drenched In Tears Empire Art Rock 71 (2004, CD)
2004: Music From Time And Space Vol. 8 (Eclipsed) Neronia - One Moment Music From Time And Space Vol. 8 (2004, CD)

Music videos 
 1994: Forever Lost

Members

Original members 
 Ender Kilic – bass (1990–present)
 Mirko Rudnik – guitars (1990–present)
 Thomas Diehl – keyboards (1990-1995)
 Jasper Stannow – drums (1991-1992)
 Gerard Hynes – vocals (1991-1993)

Current members 
 Ender Kilic – bass, keyboards (1990–present)
 Mirko Rudnik – guitars, keyboards, b-vox (1990–present)
 Robert Zoom – drums, keyboards, b-vox (1992–present)
 Gerard Hynes – vocals (1991-1993, 2021–present)

Former members 
 Andreas Simon – drums (1990)
Peter Lerch – drums (1991)
Marc Jost – vocals, guitars (1994-1995)
 Thomas Cordey – keyboards (1995)

External links 

 Ulysses Rersurrrection Project

References 

German progressive rock groups
Musical groups established in 1990
Metal Mind Productions artists
Inside Out Music artists
Massacre Records artists
German rock music groups